Lady Maryland is a  gaff-rigged, wood-hulled pungy topsail schooner. She is owned and operated by the Baltimore-based Living Classrooms Foundation and is used as an educational vessel. Lady Maryland is one of four historic wooden sailing ship replicas designed by Thomas C. Gillmer.

References

External links

1986 ships
Individual sailing vessels
Replica ships
Schooners of the United States
Two-masted ships
Oyster schooners
Sail training ships
Education in Baltimore
Chesapeake Bay boats
Sailboat type designs by Thomas C. Gillmer